Maiorerus is a genus of harvestmen belonging to the family Phalangodidae.

Species:
 Maiorerus randoi Rambla, 1993

References

Harvestmen